

This is a list of the buildings, sites, districts, and objects listed on the National Register of Historic Places in the United States Virgin Islands. There are currently 88 listed sites spread across 16 of the 20 subdistricts within three  islands/districts of the United States Virgin Islands. Four sites are additionally designated National Historic Landmarks and two others as National Historic Sites.

Numbers of listings 
The following are approximate tallies of current listings in the United States Virgin Islands on the National Register of Historic Places. These counts are based on entries in the National Register Information Database as of April 24, 2008 and new weekly listings posted since then on the National Register of Historic Places web site. There are frequent additions to the listings and occasional delistings and the counts here are not official. Also, the counts in this table exclude boundary increase and decrease listings which modify the area covered by an existing property or district and which carry a separate National Register reference number.

Saint Croix 

|}

Saint John 

|}

Former listings

|}

Saint Thomas 

|}

See also

List of United States National Historic Landmarks in United States commonwealths and territories, associated states, and foreign states

References

 
United States Virgin Islands-related lists